The Slingshot is a Swedish drama film which was released to cinemas in Sweden on 24 September 1993, starring Jesper Salén, Stellan Skarsgård and Basia Frydman. Directed by Åke Sandgren, the film was based on Roland Schütt's 1989 autobiographical novel of the same name (translates to "The Condom Slingshot").

Plot
Roland (Salén) is the 12-year-old son of a Russian Jewish mother (Frydman) and a socialist father (Skarsgård), coming of age in 1920s Stockholm. Due to his family's background, he has become an outcast to those around him, a constant target of bullying by his peers, and often humiliated and physically punished by a sadistic schoolteacher (Ernst-Hugo Järegård) in front of classmates. In retaliation against his tormentors, Roland steals condoms from his mother's tobacco shop inventory and turns them into crude slingshot weapons. He also falls in love with a neighbourhood girl (Frida Hallgren), but as Roland attempts to toughen up and improve his troubled life, he also allies with the wrong group of friends and inadvertently makes himself a juvenile offender.

Shooting
Most outdoor scenes were shot in Prague as the Stockholm townscape at the time was considered to have undergone too many changes to depict the 1920s.

Cast
 Jesper Salén as Roland Schütt
 Stellan Skarsgård as Fritiof Schütt
 Basia Frydman as Zipa Schütt
 Niklas Olund as Bertil Schütt
 Ernst-Hugo Järegård as Teacher Lundin
 Ernst Günther as Principal
 Axel Düberg as Inspector Gissle
 Reine Brynolfsson as Hinke Berggren
 Heinz Hopf as Shoe salesman
 Frida Hallgren as Margit
 Tomas Norström as Boxing Trainer
 Ing-Marie Carlsson as Karin Adamsson
 Rolf Lassgård as Prisoner

Reception
The Danish-Swedish production has an 89% "fresh" rating on Rotten Tomatoes. AllMovie critic Clarke Fountain called the film an "affectionate, richly detailed portrait", while film critic James Berardinelli gave the film three and a half out of four stars and called it "a wonderful mix of tragedy, humor, and triumph." Conversely, the Washington Post had an unfavorable view of the movie and called the story "a catalogue of catastrophes that surely left the real protagonist with many emotional scars."

At the 29th Guldbagge Awards the film won the award for Best Film. Åke Sandgren was nominated for both Best Director and Best Screenplay, while Basia Frydman was nominated for Best Actress.

The film was the Swedish submission to the 66th Academy Awards for Best Foreign Language Film, but did not make nomination.

Year-end lists 
 Best "sleepers" (not ranked) – Dennis King, Tulsa World

See also
 List of submissions to the 66th Academy Awards for Best Foreign Language Film
 List of Swedish submissions for the Academy Award for Best Foreign Language Film

References

External links

1993 films
1993 drama films
1990s coming-of-age drama films
Swedish coming-of-age drama films
1990s Swedish-language films
Films based on Swedish novels
Films about bullying
Films about Jews and Judaism
Films based on biographies
Antisemitism in Sweden
Swedish independent films
Films set in the 1920s
Films set in the 1930s
Sony Pictures Classics films
Films scored by Björn Isfält
Best Film Guldbagge Award winners
Films directed by Åke Sandgren
Films set in Stockholm
Films shot in Prague
1993 independent films
1990s Swedish films